This Fuckin' Guy is a concept EP by avant-garde artist John S. Hall released on March 10, 2015 under the name of his band King Missile IV by Powertool Records. The album has been made when King Missile was touring with American band LoveyDove. Two of their members had joined Hall in the making of the album.

Concept
The album is a regroupement of poetic texts about the beauty of the world's landscapes narrated by a character known as The Fuckin' Guy. He comments what he sees and how he feels about it while swearing and cursing non-stop. There are barely any lines in the EP without a curse word. The settings are mostly in the New York area.

Blog
The character of The Fuckin' Guy was created by John S. Hall in 2014 in a blogspot account named This Fckin' Blog. It contains other texts on other subjects in the same style. The blog went on hiatus a couple of months after the release of the EP, and resumed shortly after Donald Trump assumed the presidency.

Track listing

Personnel
Adapted from the This Fuckin' Guy liner notes.

King Missile
 John S. Hall – lead vocals
 Azalia Snail – omnichord, percussion, backing vocals
 Dan West – bass guitar, guitar, effects, backing vocals

Production and design
 Mark Chalecki – mastering

Release history

References

External links 
 
 This Fuckin' Guy at Discogs (list of releases)
 This Fuckin' Guy at Bandcamp

2015 EPs
King Missile albums